Shikari may refer to:

Films
 Shikari (1946 film), a Bollywood film
 Shikari (1963 film), a Hindi film
 Shikari (1981 film), a Hindi film of 1981
 Shikari (1991 film), a Hindi film
 Shikari (2000 film), a Hindi film
 Shikari (2012 film), a Kannada and Malayalam film
 Shikari (2016 film), an Indian-Bangladeshi film

Other uses
 HMS Shikari (D85), a British Admiralty S class destroyer
 Shikari (DC Comics), a fictional character from the DC comics Legion of Super-Heroes series
 Shikari Shambu, an Indian comic character created by Vasant Halbe

See also 
 Shikaar (disambiguation)
 Shikara (disambiguation)